Neil Young is the debut studio album by Canadian / American musician Neil Young following his departure from Buffalo Springfield in 1968, issued on Reprise Records, catalogue number RS 6317. The album was first released on November 12th 1968 in the so-called 'CSG mix'. It was then partially remixed and re-released in late summer 1969, but at no time has the album ever charted on the Billboard 200.

Release history
The first release of the album used the Haeco-CSG encoding system. This technology was intended to make stereo records compatible with mono record players, but had the unfortunate side effect of degrading the sound. Young was unhappy with the first release. "The first mix was awful", he was reported as saying in Cash Box of September 6, 1969. "I was trying to bury my voice, because I didn't like the way it sounded".

The album was therefore partially remixed and re-released without Haeco-CSG processing. Most of the songs from the original album were re-released as-is, only without the Haeco-CSG processing. Only three were remixed, which were replaced on the master tapes: "If I Could Have Her Tonight", "Here We Are in the Years", and "What Did You Do to My Life?". The words "Neil Young" were added to the top of the album cover after what was left of the original stock had been used up, so copies of both mixes exist in the original sleeve. Copies of the original mix on vinyl are now rare and much sought-after by Neil Young fans who believe that the remix diminished the songs, especially "Here We Are in the Years".

Neil Young was remastered and released on HDCD-encoded compact discs and digital download on July 14, 2009, as part of the Neil Young Archives Original Release Series. It was released on audiophile vinyl in December 2009, both individually and as part of a box-set of Neil's first four LPs available via his official website. This box set was limited to 1000 copies. The remaster was also released on CD, individually and as Disc 1 of a 4-CD box set Official Release Series Discs 1-4, released in the US in 2009 and Europe in 2012. High resolution digital files of both the CSG and non-CSG albums are available to subscribers on the Neil Young Archives website.

Reception

Rolling Stone wrote "in many ways, a delightful reprise of that Springfield sound done a new way". In its retrospective review, AllMusic described it as "an uneven, low-key introduction to Young's solo career".

Track listing
All tracks are written by Neil Young, except where noted. Arrangements on "The Old Laughing Lady", "String Quartet from Whiskey Boot Hill" and "I've Loved Her So Long" by Young, Jack Nitzsche and Ry Cooder. Track timings are from the original 1969 vinyl release, catalogue number RS 6317.

Personnel
 Neil Young – vocals, guitars, piano, synthesizer, harpsichord, pipe organ, production
 Ry Cooder – guitar, production
 Jack Nitzsche – electric piano, arrangements, production
 Jim Messina, Carol Kaye – bass
 George Grantham, Earl Palmer – drums
 Merry Clayton, Brenda Holloway, Patrice Holloway, Gloria Richetta Jones, Sherlie Matthews, Gracia Nitzsche – backing vocals
 unidentified - trumpet, trombone, tenor saxophone, French horn, clarinet, timpani, strings

Production
 David Briggs – production
 Dale Batchelor, Donn Landee, Mark Richardson, Henry Saskowski – engineering
 Rik Pekkonen – arrangements, engineering
 Danny Kelly – photography
 Ed Thrasher – album art direction
 Roland Diehl – cover painting

Charts

References

External links
 Official documentation for Neil Young

Neil Young albums
1969 debut albums
Albums produced by David Briggs (producer)
Albums produced by Jack Nitzsche
Reprise Records albums
Albums produced by Neil Young
Albums produced by Ry Cooder
Albums recorded at Sunset Sound Recorders
Albums recorded at Wally Heider Studios